Deva (Hungarian: Déva,; German: Diemrich, Schlossberg, Denburg; Latin: Sargetia; Turkish: Deve, Devevar) is a city in Romania, in the historical region of Transylvania, on the left bank of the river Mureș. It is the capital of Hunedoara County.

Name
Its name was first recorded in 1269 as castrum Dewa. The origin of the name gave rise to controversy. It is considered that the name comes from the ancient Dacian word dava, meaning "fortress" (as in Pelendava, Piroboridava, or Zargidava). Other theories trace the name to a Roman Legion, the Legio II Augusta, transferred to Deva from Castrum Deva, now Chester (Deva Victrix) in Britain. János András Vistai assume the name is of old Turkic origin from the name Gyeücsa. Others assert that the name is probably of Slavic origin where Deva or Devín means "girl" or "maiden" (a similar case exists in Slovakian for the Devín Castle, located at the confluence of the Danube and Great Morava, at the site of the former town of Devín) or from the Old Hungarian name Győ. Additionally, it is possible the name Deva was derived from the reconstructed proto-Indo-European dhewa ("settlement"). On medieval maps Deva appears as: Dewan (first mention), Deva, or later Diemrich.

History
Documentary evidence of the city's existence first appeared in 1269 when Stephen V, King of Hungary and Duke of Transilvania, mentioned "the royal castle of Deva" in a privilege-grant for the Count Chyl of Kelling. Partially destroyed by the Ottoman Turks in 1550, it was afterward rebuilt and the fortress extended. In 1621 Prince Gabriel Bethlen transformed and extended the Magna Curia Palace (also known as the Bethlen Castle) in Renaissance style.
 
In 1711–1712, Deva was settled by a group of Roman Catholic Bulgarian merchant refugees from the unsuccessful anti-Ottoman Chiprovtsi Uprising of 1688. The refugees were originally mostly from Chiprovtsi and Zhelezna, though also from the neighbouring Kopilovtsi and Klisura. However, the refugees came to Deva from Wallachia and from Alvinc (now Vinţu de Jos, Romania), where a similar colony had been established in 1700.

They numbered in 1716 51 families and three Franciscan friars, established their own neighbourhood, which was known to the locals as Greci ("Greeks", i.e. "merchants"). Their influence over local affairs caused Deva to be officially called a "Bulgarian town" for a short period, even though the maximum population of the colony was 71 families in 1721. The Bulgarians received royal privileges of the Austrian crown along with their permission to settle and their acquisition of land and property. The construction of Deva's Franciscan friary commenced in 1724 with the funding and efforts of its Bulgarian population, so that the monastery was commonly known as the Bulgarian Monastery. However, the Great Plague of 1738 and the gradual assimilation of the Deva Bulgarians into other ethnicities of Transylvania prevented the colony from growing and by the late 19th century the Bulgarian ethnic element in the town had disappeared completely.

Jewish history

Jews first settled in the town in the 1830s, organizing a community in 1848. Rabbi Moshe Herzog (1893-1898) delivered patriotic sermons in Hungarian. The synagogue was rebuilt in 1925. In 1923, the strictly Orthodox established their own congregation under Hayyim Yehuda Ehrenreich, a rabbinical scholar whose periodical Otzar ha-Hayyim became renowned in Jewish academic circles. In 1927, he set up a press that printed classical Hebrew works.

Zionist organizations were especially active in the mid-1920s. In 1930, there were 914 Jews, or 8.7% of the total. On 5 December 1940, during the National Legionary State, Jewish merchants were forced to give up their shops to members of the ruling Iron Guard. In June 1941, when Romania entered World War II, 695 Jewish refugees from surrounding villages were brought to Deva. In the war's aftermath, many remained there. There were 1190 Jews in 1947; the majority emigrated to Israel after 1948.

Geography
Deva is situated in the central part of Hunedoara County, on the left bank of the middle course of the Mureș River at 187 m above sea level. The city administers four villages: Archia (Árki), Bârcea Mică (Kisbarcsa), Cristur (Csernakeresztúr) and Sântuhalm (Szántóhalma).

Demographics

In 1850, the town had 2,129 inhabitants, of which 1,038 were Romanians (48.8%), 517 Hungarians (24.3%), 255 Germans (12%), 216 Roma (10.1%) and 103 (4.8%) of other ethnicities, meanwhile in 1910, out of 8,654 inhabitants, 5,827 were Hungarians (67.33%), 2,417 Romanians (27.92%), 276 Germans (3.18%) and 134 (1.57%) of other ethnicities.

According to the last census, from 2011, there were 56,647 people living within the city of Deva, making it the 37th largest city in Romania. The ethnic makeup is as follows:

 Romanians: 89.67%
 Hungarians: 7.79%
 Roma: 1.6%
 Other: 0.91%

Economy
Automotive, commerce, construction materials and power industries are important to Deva's economy.

Education 
A private University of Ecology and Tourism was established in the city in 1990, and the academic centres of Timișoara and Cluj-Napoca have opened branches in the city. Deva is also the home of Romania's national women gymnastics training center called Colegiul National Sportiv "Cetatea" Deva .
Here is a list of the high schools from Deva:

 Decebal National College 
 Traian Theoretical High School  
 Sabin Drăgoi Theoretical High School  
 Colegiul Național Sportiv "Cetatea"  
 Sigismund Toduță High School of Arts 
 Téglás Gábor Theoretical High School 
 Transylvania Technical College  
 Grigore Moisil Technical High School 
 Dragomir Hurmuzescu Technical College 

*Traian Theoretical High School was disbanded in 2014 and the students were enrolled at Decebal National College.

Natives 
 François Bréda
 María Corda
 Matthias Dévay
 Florentina Iusco
 Kocsárd Janky
 Bogdan Juratoni
 Maria Neculiță
 Franz Nopcsa von Felső-Szilvás
 Dora Pavel
 Pál Réthy
 Daniela Silivaș
 Adrian Sitaru

Climate 
Deva has a humid continental climate (Koppen: Dfb) with warm summers and cold winters. Precipitation peaks in the month of June.

Tourism and sport
Deva is dominated by the Citadel Hill, a protected nature reserve because of its rare floral species and the presence of the horned adder. Perched on the top of the hill are the ruins of the Citadel built in the 13th century. Tourists can visit the Citadel by climbing the hill or using the cable car. The machinery covers a distance of 160 meters and it can transport up to 16 people.

Deva's tourist attractions include the Arts Theatre, the Patria Cinema, the Old Centre and the Citadel Park, where there are the statues of Mihai Eminescu and Decebal and the Magna Curia Palace. There is also the Aqualand Complex, a recently built leisure centre situated near the Citadel Park. It is an important tourist spot for the Transylvania region. Downtown the city, the House of culture and the musical fountain represent two elements that define the town centre of Deva.

Deva is considered the Gymnastics capital of Romania because the National gymnastics training center is located in the city. Many of the country's Olympic gymnasts have trained in Deva, including Nadia Comăneci.

Twinned cities
  Arras, France
  Cherbourg-Octeville, France
  Szigetvár, Hungary
  Yancheng, China

Photo gallery

References

External links

 
 Deva City Hall Official Site 

 
Populated places in Hunedoara County
Localities in Transylvania
Cities in Romania
Capitals of Romanian counties